Plectrophenax is a small genus of passerine birds of the longspur family Calcariidae.

Taxonomy
The genus Plectrophenax was introduced in 1882 by the Norwegian born zoologist Leonhard Stejneger with the snow bunting as the type species. The name combines the Ancient Greek plēktron meaning "cock’s spur" with phenax meaning "imposter".

Species
The genus contains two species, which may be conspecific.

They are high Arctic breeding seed-eating birds with stubby, conical bills, and much white in the plumage, especially in adult males. They nest in rock crevices. As would be expected, both species are highly migratory, wintering in more temperate areas.

The plumages are similar, but McKay's has more white and less black in the plumage, especially in the wings and tail. Adult breeding males of both species are mainly white with contrasting black on at least the wings, but are duller in winter. Females have white and brown plumage. The calls of both species are identical and include a low warbled hudidi feet feet feew hudidi feet feet feew hudidi.

References

 
Calcariidae
Bird genera